Bucher Industries AG is an internationally operating Swiss engineering group. Listed on the SIX Swiss Exchange, the company generated sales of CHF 3.2 billion in 2021 and employed 13,600 people.

Field of activity 
The Group operates in four specialized sections in the industrially related markets of mechanical and vehicle engineering, as well as through a section of independent individual businesses:

Kuhn Group is the world's leading supplier of specialized agricultural machinery for tillage, planting and seeding, nutrient management and crop protection, hay and forage harvesting, livestock bedding and feeding as well as landscape maintenance. Kuhn Group operates manufacturing facilities in France, the Netherlands, the United States and Brazil and is the group's largest business segment in terms of sales.

Bucher Municipal is a leading global supplier of municipal vehicles and equipment for cleaning and clearing operations on public and private roads and other traffic areas. The product range includes sweepers and sewer cleaning, winter maintenance and refuse collection vehicles and equipment. The product portfolio is supplement by digital services. Production facilities are located in Europe, North America, Australia and Asia.

Bucher Hydraulics offers a comprehensive portfolio of electronic and hydraulic components and is a leading international manufacturer of advanced electrohydraulic systems. The product range includes pumps, motors, valves and manifold block solutions, cylinders, power units, power electronics and system solutions Production facilities are located in Europe, the USA, China and India.

Bucher Emhart Glass is the world's leading supplier of advanced technologies for manufacturing and inspection of glass containers. The product range includes glass forming and inspection machines and spare parts, as well as consulting and service for the hollow glassware industry. Production facilities are located in Sweden, the USA and Malaysia. Emhart Glass is headquartered in Switzerland with its research and development center being located in the USA.

Bucher Specials comprises independent businesses: machinery and equipment for wine production (Bucher Vaslin), for fruit juice production, dewatering of municipal or industrial sludge, and food dehydration (Bucher Unipektin), as well as the control systems engineering and process technology (Jetter AG) business, and agricultural machinery in Switzerland (Bucher Landtechnik).

History 
The company was founded in 1807 when Heinrich Bucher-Weiss (1784-1850) took over a forge in Murzeln in Niederweningen. The forge was subsequently operated by three generations and registered in the Company register in 1874. At the end of the 19th century, Bucher also began to sell agricultural machinery from foreign manufacturers.

Bucher expanded its activities during the first half of the 20th century. In 1951, the former family business was changed into a joint-stock company.

In 1984, the group of companies gave itself a holding structure. In 1986, it was opened to the public and went public. At that time, the Group generated sales of CHF 430 million and had 2,730 employees. The Initial public offering marked the beginning of Bucher's expansion and acquisition phase. This resulted in the division into today's four divisions and individual businesses starting in 1996.

References

External links 
Official website

Publicly traded companies
Manufacturing companies of Switzerland
Machine manufacturers
Companies based in the canton of Zürich
Niederweningen
1807 establishments